The 2017 Copa Argentina Final was the 133rd. and final match of the 2016–17 Copa Argentina. It was played on December 9, 2017 at the Estadio Malvinas Argentinas in Mendoza between River Plate and Atlético Tucumán.

River Plate defeated Atlético Tucumán 2–1 to win their second tournament title. As champions, they qualified for 2017 Supercopa Argentina.

Atlético Tucumán, as runners-up, won the right to play in the 2018 Copa Libertadores because River Plate had already qualified as Primera División runners-up.

Qualified teams

Road to the final

Match details

Statistics

References

2017 in Argentine football
2016-17
2016–17 domestic association football cups
Copa Argentina Final 2017
Copa Argentina Final 2017